Clytus arietis, the wasp beetle,  is a wasp-mimicking longhorn beetle species in the genus Clytus.

Description
It reaches  in length, and flies well in sunshine from May to July, often visiting flowers for pollen and nectar. It is harmless but is protected by its wasp-like colours and movements, making it a Batesian mimic. The larvae live in dead wood. It also emanates a wasp buzz-like noise when threatened. They can be seen wandering around on flowers from late spring to early summer, and they are easily mistaken for wasps. They are not to be confused with another wasp-mimicking longhorn beetle, Rutpela maculata.

See also
Batesian mimicry

References

External links

Clytini
Beetles of Europe
Beetles described in 1758
Articles containing video clips
Taxa named by Carl Linnaeus